Francis James Kendall (25 July 1908 – 10 September 1966) was an English cricketer. Kendall was a left-handed batsman who left-arm medium pace. He was born at Hardingstone, Northamptonshire.

Kendall made his first-class debut for Northamptonshire in the 1930 County Championship against Kent at the Crabble Athletic Ground, Dover. He made two further first-class appearances in that season's County Championship, against Hampshire at Dean Park, Bournemouth, and Nottinghamshire at the County Ground, Northampton. He took a total of 6 wickets in his three appearances, which came at an average of 28.66, with best figures of 2/26.

He died at Northampton, Northamptonshire on 10 September 1966.

References

External links
Francis Kendall at ESPNcricinfo
Francis Kendall at CricketArchive

1908 births
1966 deaths
Cricketers from Northampton
English cricketers
Northamptonshire cricketers
People from Hardingstone